Antena 1 is one of the three national radio channels produced by the Portuguese public broadcasting entity Rádio e Televisão de Portugal, the others being Antena 2 and Antena 3.

Antena 1 has a generalist programming policy focusing mainly on news, current affairs and sport, as well as the discussion of contemporary social issues. Musically, Antena 1 is a 
Hot AC station with a strong emphasis on Portuguese popular music.

The Macanese radio and television company Teledifusão de Macau relays Antena 1's programmes overnight between 20.00 and 7.00 (8.00 on Saturdays and Sundays) Beijing Time (UTC+8).

In December 2019, it had a weekly reach share of 10.9%.

Transmitters

MW
Bragança 666 kHz
Castelo Branco District 720 kHz
CEN 666 kHz
Coimbra 630 kHz
Covilhã 666 kHz
Elvas 720 kHz
Guarda 720 kHz
Lamego 756 kHz
Miranda do Douro 630 kHz
Mirandela 720 kHz
Monte das Cruzes (Azores) 828 kHz
Portalegre 1287 kHz
Valença 666 kHz
Vila Real 666 kHz
Viseu 666 kHz

FM

Mainland
Alcoutim 88.9
Arestal 106.7
Banática 99.4
Bornes 92.8
Braga 91.3
Bragança 96.4
Castelo Branco 89.9
Coimbra 94.9
Elvas 103.8
Faro 97.6
Gardunha 96.4
Grândola 99.2
Gravia 104.5
Guarda 94.7
Janas 96.9
Leiria 98.7
Lousã 87.9
Manteigas 104.8
Marão 95.2
Marofa 97.2
Mendro 87.7
Mértola 90.9
Minhéu 94.9
Miranda do  Douro 90.3
Moledo 102.9
Monchique 88.9
Monsanto 95.7
Montargil 93.6
Monte da Virgem 96.7
Montejunto 98.3
Muro 88.3
Paredes de Coura 102.9
Portalegre 97.9
Rendufe 89.2
S.Domingos 87.9
Santarém 98.8
Serra de Ossa 88.4
Tróia 106.7
Valença 98.2
Viseu 88.2

Azores
Arrife 94.5
Cabeço Gordo 88.9
Cabeço Verde 98.1
Cascalho Negro 92.2
Espalamaca 93.8
Fajãzinha 100.4
Furnas 93.6
Lajes das Flores 102.6
Lajes do Pico 96.5
Macela 87.6
Monte das Cruzes 99.8
Morro Alto 93.5
Nordeste 104.6
Nordestinho 103.7
Pico Alto Sta. Maria 96.7
Pico Bartolomeu 92.7
Pico da Barrosa 97.9
Pico das Éguas 89.5
Pico do Geraldo 103.7
Pico do Jardim 97.0
Ponta Delgada 94.1
Ponta Ruiva 87.6
Povoação 102.8
S. Mateus 103.4
Serra do Cume 99.7
Sta. Bárbara 90.5

Madeira
Achadas da  Cruz 104.3
Cabo Girão 96.7
Calheta 105.4
Caniço 101.6
Encumeada 93.1
Funchal (Monte) 104.6
Gaula 98.5
Maçapez 92.0
Paúl da Serra 101.9
Pico do Areeiro 95.5
Pico do Facho 93.1
Ponta do Pargo 90.2
Porto Santo 100.5
Ribeira Brava105.6
Santa Clara 104.6

East Timor
Dili 103.1

See also
List of radio stations in Portugal

References

External links
Official homepage of Antena 1 (in Portuguese)
Official homepage of Rádio Macau (in Portuguese) 
Antena 1 Live Stream on RTP Play

Mass media in Macau
Portuguese-language radio stations
Radio stations in China
Radio stations in Portugal
Radio stations established in 1935
1935 establishments in Portugal
Rádio e Televisão de Portugal
News and talk radio stations